Several ships have been named Roxburgh Castle for Roxburgh Castle:

 was launched in Spain in 1803 under another name. She was taken in prize in 1809 and her new owners renamed her. She was wrecked in 1814.
 was launched by  Wigrams & Green, Blackwall. She made two voyages for the British East India Company, during the first of which she captured a slave schooner with 125 slaves that she delivered to Sierra Leone. She was condemned as unseaworthy after survey in 1842 and sold for breaking up.
 was launched at Sunderland. She was sold to a Danish company in 1870. She was wrecked in 1872.
 was an iron screw-steamer launched at Sunderland.
She was broken up in 1971.

Citations

Ship names